Health is the an level of functional and/or metabolic efficiency of may also refer to:

 Health care, the prevention, treatment, and management of illness
 Health care compared, brief comparison chart of several systems
 Health care industry, an industry providing health care services
 Health economics, a branch of economics concerned with health and health care
 Health law, law affecting the health care industry
 Public health, the overall health of a community
 Environmental health, the branch of public health concerned with aspects of environment that may affect human health

Human sciences 
 Health education, the process of learning to behave in a manner conducive to good health
 Health effect, a change in health resulting from exposure to a source
 Health psychology, a branch of psychology concerned with understanding how biology, behavior, and social context influence health
 Health promotion, the process of enabling people to increase their health
 Health science, the applied science dealing with health
 Mental health, a level of cognitive or emotional wellbeing
 Reproductive health, the capability and freedom to reproduce

Arts, entertainment, and media 
 Health (TV series), a 1959 educational series that aired on ABC
 Health (band), an American noise rock band
 Health (Health album), 2007 album by Health
 Health (film), a 1980 film directed by Robert Altman
 Health (game terminology), the value of health- or hit- points of a game character
 Health (Heavy Blinkers album)
 Health (journal), peer-reviewed healthcare journal
 Health (magazine), a magazine focused on women's health

Software 
 Health (Apple), a health-tracking platform by Apple
 Google Health, a personal health information centralization service by Google
 Microsoft HealthVault, a web-based personal health record created by Microsoft
 MSN Health & Fitness, a discontinued health-tracking platform by Microsoft

Other uses
 Health, Arkansas, a community in the United States
 Fashion health, a form of legal brothel in Japan

See also